Events in the year 1999 in the Palestinian territories.

Incumbents
Palestinian National Authority (non-state administrative authority)
Yasser Arafat (Fatah), President,  5 July 1994 – 11 November 2004

Events
The Palestinian Central Council decided on 29 April to put off declaring independence until after the Israeli elections, triggering riots in the territories
3,000 Palestinians participated in a "Day of Rage" on 3 June, protesting the expansion of Israeli settlements in the West Bank
The Palestinian Authority joined the Parliamentary Union of the OIC Member States upon its inception on 17 June in Iran
PLO Chairman Yasser Arafat and Israeli Prime Minister Ehud Barak signed the Sharm el-Sheikh Memorandum, an interim peace agreement, on 4 September
The Israeli government pre-emptively handed civilian control of 7% of the West Bank to the Palestinian Authority on 10 September, the first transfer of legal authority in 1999, in preparation for peace talks later that week
Bilateral negotiations over Palestine's final status are conducted from 13 September-3 October, but no deal was signed due to disputes over Jerusalem, Palestinian refugees, and travel rights between Gaza and the West Bank
Unemployment in the West Bank was estimated at 9.6%
Unemployment in Gaza was estimated at 17%

Deaths
Mohammed Shreiteh, father of eight who allegedly sustained terminal injuries stemming from police beating him a day earlier while he was in custody, died on 10 September in Hebron
Mahmoud Mohammed al-Bajjali, father of three who died in prison after serving five years in prison without trial, died on 3 December in Ramallah

See also
1999 in Israel

References

 
1990s in the Palestinian territories
Years of the 20th century in the Palestinian territories
Palestinian territories
Palestinian territories